NY77: The Coolest Year in Hell is a 2007 documentary directed by Henry Corra that originally aired on VH1.

Overview
A reminiscence on life in New York City during the year 1977. It chronicles the decay of a city plagued by economic decline, rampant crime, the Son of Sam killings, and the July 13–14 blackout. These events provided the breeding ground for both the punk rock and hip hop movements that would eventually spread worldwide throughout the 1980s.

References

External links

2007 television films
2007 films
Documentary films about New York City
Punk films
2000s hip hop films
Films set in the 1970s
Films set in 1977
Films set in 2007
2000s English-language films
American documentary films
2000s American films